The 1995 Copa del Rey Final was the 93rd final of the Spanish cup competition, the Copa del Rey. The final was played at Santiago Bernabéu Stadium in Madrid on 24 June 1995. The match was suspended on 79 minutes due to heavy rain and hail. It was resumed on 27 June 1995. The match was won by Deportivo de La Coruña, who beat Valencia CF 2–1. Deportivo won the cup for the first time.

Road to the final

Match details

References

External links
 RSSSF.com

1995
1
Valencia CF matches
Deportivo de La Coruña matches